Amalda novaezelandiae is a species of small sea snail, a gastropod mollusc of the family Ancillariidae. This species is endemic to New Zealand and appears in the fossil record

References

 Powell A W B, New Zealand Mollusca, William Collins Publishers Ltd, Auckland, New Zealand 1979 

novaezelandiae
Gastropods of New Zealand
Gastropods described in 1859